The Grenff, also Grenf, is an approximately 21.9 km long, right-hand or southeasterly tributary of Schwalm in East Hesse Highlands in North Hesse Schwalm-Eder-Kreis and belongs to the river system and catchment area of the Weser.

Course  
The Grenff rises in Ottrauer Highland, a part of the Fulda-Haune Plateau in East Hesse Highlands, in the transition area to the Knüllgebirge.
The source is 1.2 km southeast of the village Görzhain (municipality Ottrau) in a clearing of the northern flank  of the Frohnkreuzkopf (about ), the western spur of the Rimberg (591.8 m), at about 395 m elevation.

Initially flows the Grenff which runs predominantly north-west, to and through Görzhain. From there on the Bad Hersfeld–Treysa railway (also Knüllwald railway) runs through the Grenff valley. It passes along the settlement Bahnhof Ottrau  and a number of watermills (Boßmühle, Steinmühle, Lenzenmühle, Schneidmühle) and the village Kleinropperhausen.
Then the Grenff flows through the riverside towns Nausis, after which it flows past the Bruchmühle, Neukirchen, Rückershausen, after which it passes the Sängermühle, and Riebelsdorf.
Thereafter, the river passes the station Zella and Klinkemühle. At the village of Loshausen
(Willingshausen municipality) it flows into the Eder tributary Schwalm that comes from the south, after overcoming of approximately 181 m difference in altitude.

Catchment and tributaries  
The drainage basin of Grenff includes 86.406 km². Its tributaries are (orographic allocation (l. = on the left side, r. = on the right side) , river length and confluence location, Grenff river kilometer (starting from the mouth ): 
 Reinsbach (r. 1.5 km) above Görzhain (near km 21) 
 Weissenborn (r. 2.2 km), in Görzhain (at km 20.05) 
 Leutschwasser (l. 2, 2 km), in Görzhain (at km 19.55) 
 Schorbach (r. 5.2 km), at the Stone mill  (near km 17,05) 
 Otter (l. 5.6 kilometers) above the  Lenz mill  (at km 15.8) 
 Wallebach (l. 2.5 km), in Nausis (near 12.8 km) 
 Fischbach (l. 1.5 km), in Nausis (near 11.9 km) 
 Damersbach (r. 3.3 km), below Nausis (near 11.6 km) 
 Buchenbach (r. 7.7 kilometers) above Neukirchen (near km 9.8) 
 Urbach (r. 7.3 km) Neukirchen (near km 8.1) 
 Goldbach (r. 2.9 km), at Rückershausen (in km 6.1)

References

External links 

Rivers of Hesse
Schwalm-Eder-Kreis
Rivers of Germany